The 98th Infantry Division ("Iroquois") was a unit of the United States Army in the closing months of World War I and during World War II.  The unit is now one of the U.S. Army Reserve's training divisions, officially known as the 98th Training Division (Initial Entry Training).  The 98th Training Division's current primary mission is to conduct Initial Entry Training (IET) for new soldiers.  It is one of three training divisions subordinate to the 108th Training Command (IET).

Following its initial organization in 1918, the 98th Training Division (IET) has experienced multiple cycles of activation, training, deployment and deactivation as well as substantial reorganizations and changes of mission.  Since 1959, however, the 98th Training Division (IET) has been a unit of the U.S. Army Reserve with the primary mission of training Soldiers.  Formerly headquartered in Rochester, New York with longstanding historical ties to New York and New England, the 98th Training Division (IET) was moved to Fort Benning, Georgia in 2012, and exercises command and control of units located throughout the eastern U.S. as well as Puerto Rico.

World War I

The 98th Division was activated at Camp McClellan, Alabama in October 1918, too late to see service in World War I. Only the headquarters was activated, demobilizing on 30 November 1918.

Interwar period

The division was reconstituted in the Organized Reserve on 24 June 1921 and assigned to the upstate portion of the state of New York. The headquarters was organized on 18 August 1921.

World War II

The 98th was ordered into active military service on 15 September 1942 at Camp Breckinridge, Kentucky, filling its ranks primarily with soldiers from New York and New England. A "triangular" division organized around a three-regiment core, the 98th spent the next eighteen months training at Camp Breckinridge, Kentucky, Camp Forrest, Tennessee and Camp Rucker, Alabama in anticipation of combat in the Pacific theater.

Order of battle

 Headquarters, 98th Infantry Division
 389th Infantry Regiment
 390th Infantry Regiment
 391st Infantry Regiment
 Headquarters and Headquarters Battery, 98th Infantry Division Artillery
 367th Field Artillery Battalion
 368th Field Artillery Battalion
 399th Field Artillery Battalion
 923rd Field Artillery Battalion
 323rd Engineer Combat Battalion
 323rd Medical Battalion
 98th Cavalry Reconnaissance Troop (Mechanized)
 Headquarters, Special Troops, 98th Infantry Division
 Headquarters Company, 98th Infantry Division
 798th Ordnance Light Maintenance Company
 98th Quartermaster Company
 98th Signal Company
 Military Police Platoon
 Band
 98th Counterintelligence Corps Detachment

Arriving in Oahu, Hawaii on 19 April 1944, the roughly 19,590 soldiers of the 98th relieved the 33rd Infantry Division of responsibility for the defense of the Hawaiian Islands and continued training for deployment to Asia. Slated as a participant in Operation Olympic, scheduled for 1 November 1945 as one of two planned invasions of Japan, the 98th was relieved of garrison duties by the 372nd Infantry Regiment on 15 May 1945 to train for that operation. However, the war drew to a close before the 98th was deployed to an active combat zone. Instead, the 98th Infantry Division arrived in Japan on 27 September 1945 and served in Osaka, Japan as part of the occupying force until 16 February 1946 when the unit was inactivated.

Awards earned by 98th Infantry Division soldiers during this period include: Legion of Merit-1; Soldier's Medal-8; Bronze Star−146.

Commanding Generals during the World War II era were:

Major General Paul L. Ransom (September 1942 – November 1943)
Major General George W. Griner Jr. (November 1943 - 26 June 1944)
Major General Ralph C. Smith (15 July 1944 – 30 August 1944)
Major General Arthur M. Harper (November 1944 - 16 February 1946)

Post World War II
On 18 April 1947, the Iroquois Division was reactivated in Rochester, New York on reserve status and began training for combat in the new Cold War environment. It had been previously planned to be an airborne division. A note on the troop list nevertheless indicated that the unit was to be reorganized and redesignated as an airborne unit upon mobilization and was to train as such.

The reorganization of 1 May 1959 redesignated the 98th Infantry Division as the 98th Division (Training) and set the unit on a course lasting to the present - training Soldiers. The regimental heritage was retained with the 389th, 390th and 391st Infantry Regiments organized as Basic Combat Training (BCT) regiments and the 392nd Infantry Regiment organized as an Advanced Individual Training (AIT) regiment.

Additional changes occurred in 1968 with the movement toward a brigade-based structure: the 389th Infantry Regiment became the 1st Brigade (BCT), the 390th Infantry Regiment became the 2d Brigade (BCT) and the 392nd Infantry Regiment became the 3rd Brigade (AIT-Engineer), the only Engineer Pioneer training unit in the Army Reserve at the time.  The 3rd Brigade/392nd Infantry Regiment was based in Hillcrest, New York and performed Engineer AIT training of Soldiers at Fort Leonard Wood, Missouri during their annual two-week training periods throughout the Vietnam War.  The changes of 1968 also ushered in the designation and training of Army Reserve Drill Sergeants, a significant and enduring innovation. Additional reorganization in 1994 redesignated the unit as the 98th Division (Institutional Training), a change in which the 98th retained its previous IET mission but also acquired the missions and force structure formerly associated with to the U.S. Army Reserve Forces schools.  The 98th would maintain this basic organization and mission for the next 14 years.

Post 9/11
On 3 September 2004, the 98th Division received mobilization orders for Operation Iraqi Freedom. This mobilization was to be the first overseas deployment for the unit since World War II. The mission, known as the Foreign Army Training Assistance Command (FA-TRAC), consisted primarily of training the new Iraqi Army and Iraqi security forces. An expeditionary force of more than 700 Iroquois warriors were trained and equipped at four sites: Camp Atterbury, Fort Bliss, Fort Hood and Fort Benning.

The demands of Operation Iraqi Freedom required an accelerated training schedule which crammed as many warfighting skills as possible into a forty-one-day period. This was the 98th's first substantial exposure to the asymmetric battlefield, requiring training in counterinsurgency techniques and preparing to face an opponent who did not fight along traditional fronts. The 98th made full use of the 33,000 acres at Camp Atterbury and marched everywhere. It was at Camp Atterbury that the advisory support teams (later renamed military training teams), the heart of the FA-TRAC mission, transformed to cohesive units in long days.

In fall 2004, the 98th Division arrived in Baghdad and filled the ranks of the Multinational Security Transition Command-Iraq (MNSTC-I), the unit charged with assisting the Iraqi government in developing, training and equipping the new Iraqi security forces. The unit used its pool of drill sergeant and instructor expertise to train Iraqi soldiers and officers to prescribed standards under the constant threat of insurgent attack and under austere conditions.

Instruction and support teams spread out across all points in Iraq from Al Kasik in the north to as far south as Umm Qasr. They established contact with Iraqi security units with the help of interpreters and helped build the six divisions of the new Iraqi Army. They also established officer and noncommissioned officer education schools at the Kirkush Military Training Base. They trained Iraqi police, the Highway Patrol, the special Police Commandos and the Iraqi Border Police.

The division also fielded soldiers to such other locations as Guantanamo Bay, Cuba, the Horn of Africa, Kuwait, Jordan and Afghanistan.

Five 98th Training Division soldiers were killed in action during the division's deployment to Iraq in 2004–05.

Subordinate units 

As of 8 July 2017 the following units are subordinate to the 98th Training Division (Initial Entry Training):

 1st Brigade (MT), Fort Benning, Georgia
 2nd Battalion, 398th Regiment (Cavalry One Station Unit Training), Madisonville, Kentucky
 2nd Battalion, 415th Regiment (Cavalry One Station Unit Training), French Camp, California
 3rd Battalion, 330th Regiment (Infantry One Station Unit Training), Waterford, Michigan
 3rd Battalion, 485th Regiment (Infantry one Station Unit Training), Fort Benning, Georgia
 2nd Brigade (Basic Combat Training), Fort Jackson, South Carolina
 3rd Battalion, 518th Regiment (Basic Combat Training), Hickory, North Carolina
 3rd Battalion, 323rd Regiment (Basic Combat Training), Athens, Georgia
 1st Battalion, 321st Regiment (Basic Combat Training), Fort Jackson, South Carolina
 2nd Battalion, 485th Regiment (Basic Combat Training), Orlando, Florida
 1st Battalion, 389th Regiment (Basic Combat Training), Fort Buchanan, Puerto Rico
 4th Battalion, 323rd Regiment (Basic Combat Training), Maxwell Air Force Base, Alabama
 3rd Brigade (Basic Combat Training), Amherst, New York
 1st Battalion, 304th Regiment (Basic Combat Training), Londonderry, New Hampshire
 2nd Battalion, 389th Regiment (Basic Combat Training), Ithaca, New York
 2nd Battalion, 417th Regiment (Basic Combat Training), Danbury, Connecticut

General
Nickname: Iroquois.

Shoulder patch: The 98th Division Patch consists of a shield in the shape of the Great seal of the State of New York, with the head of an Iroquois Indian Chief. The five feathers represent the five original Iroquois nations:  the Seneca, Onondaga, Oneida, Cayuga and Mohawk. The blue and orange-gold colors are those of the Dutch House of Nassau, the earliest settlers of New York State.
On 8 September 2012, the Armed Forces Reserve Center at Fort Benning, Georgia, where the unit is located, was memorialized in honor of Chaplain (Lieutenant Colonel) Elmer W. Heindl who had served in the 98th.

Commanding generals
 Brigadier General Charles E. Kilbourne (9 December 1928 - 11 October 1929)
 Brigadier General William Payne Jackson (18 November 1929 - 15 October 1931)
 Colonel Charles H. Morrow (15 October 1931 - 8 February 1932)
 Brigadier General Charles DuVal Roberts (8 February 1932 - 31 March 1936)
 Brigadier General Perry L. Miles (2 May 1936 - 8 January 1937)
 Brigadier General Walter C. Short (4 March 1937 - 15 June 1938)
 Colonel Thomas L. Crystal (15 June 1938 - 25 August 1938)
 Brigadier General Irving J. Phillipson (25 August 1938 - 1 March 1940)
Major General Paul L. Ransom (September 1942 - November 1943)
Major General George Wesley Griner Jr. (November 1943 - June 1944)
Major General Ralph C. Smith (July 1944 - August 1944)
Major General Arthur M. Harper (November 1944 - February 1946)
 Brigadier General Kenneth Townsend (1946-1949)
 Brigadier General Hugh Barclay (1950-1953)
 Major General John W. Morgan (1953-1957)
 Major General James C. Mott (1957-1960)
 Major General Cooper B. Rhodes (1960-1964)
 Major General Laddie L. Stahl (1964–1975)
 Major General Harry S. Parmelee (1975–1979)
 Major General Charles D. Barrett (1979–1982)
 Major General Norbert J. Rappl (1982-1987)
 Brigadier General Dean L. Linscott (1987-1987)
 Major General Barclay O. Wellman (1988–1992)
 Major General Thomas W. Sabo (1992–1996)
 Major General Peter A. Gannon (1996-2000)
 Major General Charles E. Wilson (2000–2002)
 Major General Bruce Robinson (2002–07)
 Brigadier General Robert Catalanotti (2007–08)
 Brigadier General Robert P. Stall (2008–2010)
 Brigadier General Dwayne R. Edwards (2010–12)
 Brigadier General Michaelene A. Kloster (2012–2015)
 Brigadier General Tammy S. Smith (2015-2016)
 Brigadier General Miles A. Davis (2016–2019)
 Major General Tony L. Wright (2019–2021)
 Colonel Donald L. Ellison (Acting) (2021-2022)
 Brigadier General David M. Samuelsen (2022-present)

Reference

An Encounter With History: The 98th Division and the Global War on Terrorism: 2001–2005: Publisher: Defense Department, Army, Army Reserve Command, 98th Division (Institutional Training)

098th Infantry Division, U.S.
Infantry Division, U.S. 098
United States Army divisions of World War I
Military units and formations established in 1918
1918 establishments in the United States
Infantry divisions of the United States Army in World War II